The VFW-Fokker H3 Sprinter  was a single-engined experimental rotorcraft designed and built in West Germany. Two aircraft were produced by VFW-Fokker in the early 1970s, registered D-9543 and D-9544. Intended as the first of a family of tip-jet driven helicopters the two H3 prototypes flew briefly but the method of rotor propulsion was found to be unsuccessful for this size of aircraft. An improved H4 variant was designed but not built.

Aircraft on display
Both aircraft have survived. D-9543 is currently on display at the Hubschraubermuseum Bückeburg with the other H3 thought to be in a private collection in Germany.

Specifications (H3)

See also

References

Notes

Bibliography

 Taylor, John W.R. Jane's Pocket Book of Research and Experimental Aircraft, London, Macdonald and Jane's Publishers Ltd, 1976. . 

Cancelled aircraft projects
Gyrodynes
H3
V-tail aircraft
Single-turbine helicopters
Aircraft first flown in 1971